The Boy Who Caught a Crook is a 1961 children's film about a young boy who tracks down a gangster.

Plot

Cast
 Wanda Hendrix as Laura
 Don Beddoe as Colonel
 Roger Mobley as Kid
 Richard Crane as Connors
 Johnny Seven as Rocky Kent
 Robert J. Stevenson as Sergeant
 Bill Walker as Keeper
 Henry Hunter as Flannigan

References

External links

1961 films
1960s children's adventure films
1960s English-language films
American black-and-white films
American children's adventure films
Films directed by Edward L. Cahn
Films produced by Edward Small
Films scored by Richard LaSalle
United Artists films
1960s American films